Kallumala Samaram (Stone Necklace Protest) is an agitation or social revolution by Pulayar community that took place at Perinad and nearby villages such as Cherumoodu, Kanjavely etc. in, Kollam district on 24 October 1915.

The agitation is also known as Perinad Lahala or Perinad Mutiny. It enjoy a significant position in Kerala history.

History 
The agitation was a sudden uprising against the upper class's dictum to the minority castes to not use the public road, wear good dresses, use umbrella, denying the right to education, prohibiting entry to temples, denying day off from labor and denying women to wear gold or metal ornaments.

There was a naattukoottam organised to discuss these issues but the landlord class predominantly Nair caste members rejected the proposals from Pulayas.The agitation intensified following this and the lower caste communities decided to convene a large meeting at Plavilapurayidom, Cherumoodu, near Perinad on 24 October 1915. On the day of meeting a group of nair landlords under leadership of Koori Maathu and Kannan Pillai attacked and injured many who have gathered at the meeting place. There was violent clashes between both the groups and arson ensuing this incident.

At the end by December a meeting was convened under the chair of Ayyankali, Changanassery Parameswaran Pillai and British officials on 21 December 1915 at Peeranki Maidan bringing together both the conflicting groups. In this meeting women belonging to Pulaya community threw away the Kallumala (ornaments made out of stone and woods) and proclaimed that they will only use gold or metal ornaments. Kallumala's were chains of beads worn by their ladies as a symbol of slavery and inferior caste status.

Through this agitation the oppressed class fought the caste elites by breaking their chains to win the right to wear ornaments.

During pre-independence era women from lower castes in Kerala faced severe unfathomable oppression. There were strict diktats regarding dress codes and ornaments and there was even taxes to be paid to erstwhile Travancore kings for covering their breasts.

Once the agitation was over there were lot of cases and counter cases that were filed before the magistrate. It was a renowned advocate named Elanjikkal John Vakil who represented the cases for dalits. In lieu of the lawyer's fees, he asked the accused to contribute labour to build a pond for public use at Kollam. This pond named Kamman kulam still exist near the Kollam district panchayath office, Thevally.

See also 
 Caste system in India
 Ayyankali
 Caste system in Kerala
 Channar revolt
 Ooruttambalam

References 

History of Kollam district
Caste system in India
1915 in India
People from Kollam district